Liz Weir (born October 21, 1950) is a Northern Irish children's writer and storyteller. She is currently Storyteller in Residence in Belfast and has written 27 stories. She is involved in a number of storytelling organisations including The Early Years Organisation, where she talks to children about racism, anti-bullying and respect for the elderly.

Life

Weir was timid as a child and unlikely to attend social events. If she did, it would be as a wallflower. She was Children’s librarian in the city of Belfast.

After working as a librarian in Belfast from the 1970s Weir now works as a children's author and storyteller. She was the first children's librarian for Belfast city. When not touring Ireland and the globe telling stories Weir runs the Ballyeamon Camping Barn in Glenarriff which is a hostel but also hosts music and stories. Weir works with the Writers in Schools Scheme to bring access to children and has written fifteen books for the Thinking Skills and Personal Capabilities curriculum for Northern Ireland.

In 1988, Weir was invited to Dublin where she would be meeting Roald Dahl, someone she had been a fan of all her life. Along with her daughter, she took the train down to Dublin and was greeted in her hotel by Dahl himself. He shook their hands and called her daughter a 'spoilt little devil.' He then left and Weir told a story of Dahl's to ease the wait. As the story continued she noticed that Dahl had returned and was listening to her telling the story.

In 2016 Weir became the Storyteller In Residence at Tullycarnet Library in the Knock area of Belfast. She has been the Director of the Ulster Storytelling Festival. Weir has also worked as the presenter on a BBC Radio Ulster program called The Gift of the Gab.

The author lives and works in Cushendall, Co Antrim in Northern Ireland.

Awards
Liz Weir won the inaugural International Story Bridge Award of the National Storytelling Network in 2002.
Weir has been nominated for the Astrid Lindgren Award in 2014.

Bibliography
 Boom-chicka-boom Gill & Macmillan, Dublin 1995,  .
 Boom-chicka-boom 2 O'Brien Press Ltd, Dublin 1998,  .
 Here, There and Everywhere: Stories from Many Lands O'Brien Press Ltd, Dublin 2005,  .
 Telling the Tale: storytelling Guide Library Assn. (Youth Lib.Gp.), 1989,  .
 Stand Up and Tell Them Adare P, 1991,  .
 When Dad was away Frances Lincoln Books
 Tales from the road

Television cartoons
 Together in the park

References

External links
O'Brien Biography

Irish women novelists
Writers from Belfast
Living people
1950 births